Psilogramma discistriga is a moth of the  family Sphingidae. It is known from Bangladesh.

References

Psilogramma
Moths described in 1856
Endemic fauna of Bangladesh
Moths of Asia